Pusit Phongsura is a Thai retired footballer.

References

1981 births
Living people
Pusit Phongsura
Association football goalkeepers
Samutsongkhram F.C. players
Pusit Phongsura
Pusit Phongsura